Myrtle Bothma (born 18 February 1964) is a South African hurdler. She competed in the women's 400 metres hurdles at the 1992 Summer Olympics.

References

External links
 

1964 births
Living people
Athletes (track and field) at the 1992 Summer Olympics
South African female hurdlers
Olympic athletes of South Africa
Sportspeople from East London, Eastern Cape
20th-century South African women
21st-century South African women